A by-election was held for the New South Wales Legislative Assembly electorate of Waverley on 31 October 1953 because of the death of Clarrie Martin.

Dates

Result

Preferences were not distributed.Clarrie Martin died.

See also
Electoral results for the district of Waverley
List of New South Wales state by-elections

References

New South Wales state by-elections
1953 elections in Australia
1950s in New South Wales